ESSCA School of Management is a French grande école and business school. Historically based in Angers, it now has campuses in Paris, Aix-en-Provence, Lyon, Bordeaux, Cholet, Budapest and Shanghai.

The school offers several programmes, including a five-year course (known as the "Grande École" program) delivering a diploma approved by the French state and conferring the degree of master.

Triple accredited (AACSB, EQUIS, AMBA), it is part of the Conférence des Grandes Ecoles.

Overview
ESSCA competitive entrance exam takes place after the Baccalauréat, in contrast to some French graduate schools that recruit their students after two years of preparatory classes. The graduate school relies on this exam to keep its admission rate at no more than 600 students per year.

History

Creation and development 
Founded in 1909 by the Dean of the Faculty of Law of the Catholic University of the West, ESSCA became an association (according to the French law of 1901) in 1967 and gained EESPIG certification (as a non-profit institution that works in partnership with the government to contribute to higher education and research) in 2016.

The school began by offering a two-year degree, which was extended to three years in 1954. In parallel with its change of location in Angers with the campus move to Belle-Beille, ESSCA's programs were extended in 1969 to four years. Recognized by the State in 1975, ESSCA was the first school offering direct entry after the baccalaureate to become a member of the Conférence des Grandes Écoles in 1977. The school reached the level of older French business schools. It obtained authorization to issue a state recognised diploma in 1980. In 1987, a new building (3,500 m2) was inaugurated on the Belle-Beille site. In 1993, the school opened its Paris and Budapest campuses. Since 1999 the school's masters programs have been completed in five years, aligning the MSc in management with comparable business schools in France and Europe.

ESSCA joined the ‘Management Chapter’ of the Conférence des Grandes Écoles in 1993. As part of the Bologna Process and the Bachelor-Master-Doctorate reforms, the duration of the main programme ("Grande École") was increased to 5 years in 1998, providing an integrated master's programme

The global expansion of the school started in the 1980s was consolidated by the opening of its Shanghai campus in 2006. At its 100th anniversary in 2009, ESSCA had campuses in Angers, Paris, Budapest and Shanghai.

Recent developments 
In 2001, the site In Angers was enlarged by 2,500 m2. From 2004 onwards, and after having integrated the Bologna reforms, the "Grande École" programme was recognised as a master's degree. This same programme obtained its first international accreditation in 2006: the EFMD Programme Accreditation System (EPAS) from EFMD. ESSCA was the first post-baccalaureate business school to obtain this accreditation. The 2006-2010 period was marked by the opening of the Shanghai site (2007), the extension of the original site in Angers (2009) and the relocation of the Paris site to Boulogne-Billancourt (2010), in order to accommodate larger numbers. In 2012, the "Grande École" programme offered its first apprenticeship work-based specialization in the fourth and fifth years.

ESIAME (the Bachelors level programme) left the ESSCA group in 2009, to be taken up by the Maine-et-Loire chamber of commerce and industry. The programme re-joined the ESSCA portfolio in 2016. At the start of the 2016 school year, the programme was available in Cholet and in Paris under the name Bachelor of Business Management (BBM) in International Management (ESIAME). Since then the Bachelor programme has developed and been renamed Bachelor in International Management (BMI) and is now also provided on the Aix-en-Provence, Bordeaux and Lyon campuses.

In 2014, ESSCA obtained a second international accreditation (AACSB) [13]; then a third in 2016 (EQUIS). In 2017, ESSCA is accredited by AMBA, and thus joins the small number of business schools with triple accreditation.

Accreditations and memberships
ESSCA received EPAS accreditation from the European Foundation for Management Development on 24 April 2006, becoming the first French graduate school to be awarded this international label. In May 2014, ESSCA also received AACSB-accreditation and was awarded the EQUIS accreditation in June 2016.

The school grants a Grande École master's degree (MSc in management), including several options for double-degree arrangements with French and foreign business schools and universities in Economics, International Business and other subjects.
ESSCA is also a member of the "Conférence des Grandes écoles".

ESSCA's 8 Campuses

Angers

ESSCA's 17,200 m2 building is located on the Belle Beille campus in the centre of a park, and boasts 18 amphitheatres (including one that seats 350), 40 classrooms, one multimedia room, three computer rooms, one 900 m2 media library, one meeting area, and offices for students’ associations, professors and tenured academics, as well as meeting rooms.

Paris
This campus is located in Boulogne-Billancourt, a city in the Hauts-de-Seine “department” considered a major economic centre in the Paris region. It is part of the Grand Paris Communauté Seine Ouest, which employs 100,000 individuals and is home to many corporate head offices.

Surrounded by gardens and greenery, the building (7,500 m2 over eight storeys) is located on the riverbanks of the Seine close to the Pont de Saint-Cloud subway station.

The new premises in Paris intend to promote research and specific study projects, allow for the continued development of the School's international profile by significantly increasing its capacity to accommodate students from around the world, and add to its educational programmes, in particular in the field of continued education.

Thanks to these new infrastructures, students may now complete the full undergraduate programme (three years) and then continue their specialisation through the Master programme in Paris.

ESSCA has recently opened a business incubator to provide even greater support to its young entrepreneurs. In addition, the “La Maison de l’ESSCA” foundation will welcome all of its preferred partners (businesses, institutions, graduates, etc.).

ESSCA also has campuses in Aix-en-Provence, Bordeaux (new building in the Bassins à Flot district in 2020, 2,700 m2), Cholet, and Lyon (new building in 2019).

Budapest
ESSCA has had a base in Budapest since 1993 and is the only French Business School in Hungary granting a degree accredited by the Conférence des Grandes Ecoles. ESSCA Budapest has welcomed and educated close to 1,000 students from Hungary and Central Europe, along with students from around the world. Most of them now hold senior positions in commercial and management fields

The seven storey building built in 2007 in the heart of the city, along the Danube: the "Studium". ESSCA Grande Ecole Students may spend one or two semesters at ESSCA Budapest.

Shanghai
ESSCA is particularly invested in its relation with China. After having signed various cooperation agreements with such prestigious universities as Sun Yat Sen University in Guangzhou, Tong Ji University in Shanghai, Hong Kong Baptist University, Macau University and Macau University of Science and Technology, ESSCA opened an office in Shanghai in 2006 together with its associate partner ESAI.

The centre has two objectives:

- To inform and recruit degree-seeking students from China into ESSCA various programmes

- To offer students from ESSCA and partner universities in Southeast Asia, more particularly, classes in English in economics and trade in China, as well as Chinese language classes

International Relations
The school has partnerships with 214 universities and business schools in more than 50 countries, such as McGill University, Australian National University, Sophia University, Boston University and Saint Mary's University . It currently has 22 double-degree programs which offer students the opportunity to obtain the degree of the partner university.

ESSCA organises specific welcome activities and weekends for all international students at each of the four campuses. Before arrival, staff and tutors are in contact via email and at the beginning of a new semester, orientations days are organized to help the international students get to know the school, settle into their accommodation and into student life. Throughout the year, staff are on-hand to help with all kind of issues and student associations organise activities specifically for the international students to help them integrate with the local students, and to get to know the city and the local environment.

Degree-Seeking Students
Incoming international students may study as either a degree-seeking student or as an exchange student. Degree-seeking students can choose to study in either French or English. Applicants in their final year of secondary school can apply for entry in the first year of the ESSCA "Grande Ecole Master programme" taught in French. Applicants with a first degree of Bachelor level can apply for entry into the last two years of the ESSCA "Grande École Master programme". Accredited both by the French Education Ministry and by EPAS, the EFMD programme accreditation programme, it offers a broad range of specialisations, for example, Banking and Finance, Management Accounting, Customer Relationship Marketing, Entrepreneurship, Management of Automotive Networks and several others.

Those wishing to study in English can choose one of the following programmes

- Master programme – Major  in International Business

- Master of China-Europe Business Studies

- Master programme – Major in Consumer Goods Marketing

- Master programme – Major in Entrepreneurship

Exchange Students
Exchange students have a wide choice of courses in Angers, Paris, Budapest and Shanghai both in the Fall and Spring semesters and Summer programmes in English. Students wishing to study in French should come to Angers.

Angers
Undergraduate Business programmes
First and second years in French (fall/spring semesters)
Third year core curriculum in English (fall/spring semesters)

Graduate business programmes
Master in Management in French (fall/spring semesters)
Master in international business in English (fall semester)
Master in consumer goods marketing (fall semester)
Master in entrepreneurship (fall semester)
Angers Summer Programme in English (mid-June to mid-July)

Paris
Undergraduate business programmes
Third year core curriculum in English (fall/spring semesters)

Graduate business programmes
Master's in finance in English (spring semester)
Paris summer programme in English

Budapest
Undergraduate business programme in English (fall/spring semesters)
Graduate business programme in English (fall/spring semesters)
Budapest summer programme in English (May)
Budapest summer programme in English (June)

Shanghai
Undergraduate business programme in English (fall/spring semesters)
Graduate business programme in English (fall/spring semesters)
Shanghai summer programme

NB: A limited number of places for exchange students is offered.

Summer programmes
ESSCA aims to offer short programmes for students looking to widen their horizons and gain academic credit. The summer programmes on each of campus last for four or five weeks.

Angers summer programme
The four-week Angers Summer Programme is open to all ESSCA's exchange partners. It begins with three weeks in the Loire valley city of Angers, then moves to Brussels for several days, with the final week in Paris. The programme offers an opportunity to be part of a multi-cultural student group, learn about Europe and gain credit.

The programme is open to both undergraduate and graduate students. It is specially designed for students of business and management, political sciences and international relations but applications submitted by students from other disciplines may also be considered. The programme is taught entirely in English, non-native-speaker applicants should therefore be sure to communicate in English without problems.

Paris summer programme
The four-week Paris Summer Programme offers two course pairings:

Teaching is carried out by the regular ESSCA research staff and adjunct professors with the possibility of guest speakers and outings.

Cultural events will also be offered during the 4 weeks. Instruction is in English and participants will be expected to speak and write in English on an academic level.

Budapest summer programme
This intensive four-week programme takes place the last week of June to the third week of July. The programme is open to graduate students only. Company visits are associated with specific courses.

Shanghai summer programme
The programme comprises five weeks in June and July to discover and understand China with ESAI, ESSCA's Graduate School of Management associate School in Shanghai. Taught entirely in English.

See also
 Education in France
 Grandes écoles

References

External links
 

Educational institutions established in 1909
Grandes écoles
Business schools in France
Education in Angers
1909 establishments in France